The 14th constituency of the Rhône (French: Quatorzième circonscription du Rhône) is a French legislative constituency in the Rhône département. Like the other 576 French constituencies, it elects one MP using a two round electoral system.

Description

The 14th constituency of the Rhône lies to the south east of Lyon forming part of the greater urban conglomeration.
It contains the large town of Vénissieux as well as those parts of Saint-Priest not included in Rhône's 13th constituency.

The seat has a strong left wing tradition having been represented by a Communist Party deputy for many years. At the 2017 election the incumbent PS deputy switched to En Marche. He subsequently easily held the seat in the face of a second round challenge by the National Front. The seat swung back to the left in 2022, when La France Insoumise gained the seat as part of the NUPES alliance.

Assembly Members

Election results

2022 

 
 
|-
| colspan="8" bgcolor="#E9E9E9"|
|-

2017

 
 
 
 
 
 
 
 
|-
| colspan="8" bgcolor="#E9E9E9"|
|-

2012

 
 
 
 
 
 
|-
| colspan="8" bgcolor="#E9E9E9"|
|-

2007

 
 
 
 
 
 
 
|-
| colspan="8" bgcolor="#E9E9E9"|
|-

2002

 
 
 
 
 
 
 
 
|-
| colspan="8" bgcolor="#E9E9E9"|
|-

1997

 
 
 
 
 
 
 
|-
| colspan="8" bgcolor="#E9E9E9"|
|-

References

14